The following is a list of Illinois State Redbirds men's basketball head coaches. There have been 20 head coaches of the Redbirds in their 125-season history.

Illinois State's current head coach is Ryan Pedon. He was hired as the Redbirds' head coach in March 2022, replacing Dan Muller, who was fired during the 2021–22 season.

References

Illinois State

Illinois State Redbirds basketball, men's, coaches